was a district located in Okayama Prefecture, Japan.

As of 2003, the district had an estimated population of 13,546 and a density of 30.70 persons per km2. The total area was 441.28 km2.

Towns and villages
 Ōsa
 Shingō
 Tessei
 Tetta

Merger
 On March 31, 2005 - the towns of Ōsa, Shingō, Tessei and Tetta were merged into the expanded city of Niimi. Therefore, Atetsu District was dissolved as a result of this merger.

Former districts of Okayama Prefecture